The 2011 Sham Shui Po District Council election was held on 6 November 2011 to elect all 21 elected members to the 24-member District Council.

Overall election results
Before election:

Change in composition:

References

External links
 Election Results - Overall Results

2011 Hong Kong local elections